

Operation Dragon Rouge was a hostage rescue operation in the Democratic Republic of the Congo conducted by Belgium and the United States in 1964. The operation was led by the Belgian Paracommando Regiment to rescue hostages held by Simba rebels in the city of Stanleyville.

Background 

By 1964, the Léopoldville government, supported by Western powers, was gaining a foothold in its fight to suppress the communist-backed Simba rebellion. Fearing an inevitable defeat, the rebels resorted to taking hostages of the local white population in areas under their control. On 28 October the Simba rebels arrested all Belgians and Americans in Stanleyville. Several hundred hostages were taken to Stanleyville and placed under guard in the Victoria Hotel.

The Léopoldville government turned to Belgium and the United States for help. In response, the Belgian army sent a task force to Léopoldville, airlifted by the U.S. 322nd Air Division. Washington and Brussels worked jointly on a rescue plan. Several ideas were considered and discarded, and all attempts at negotiating with the Simbas had failed.

Operation 
The Belgian task force was led by Colonel Charles Laurent. On the early morning of 24 November 1964, five American C-130 Hercules planes dropped 320 Belgian paratroopers of the Paracommando Regiment onto the airfield at Stanleyville. Once the paratroopers had secured the airfield and cleared the runway they made their way to the Victoria Hotel, prevented Simbas from killing most of the 60 hostages, and evacuated them via the airfield.

At 7:00 hrs, the hostages at Residence Victoria were rounded up by the Simba guards and ordered into the street. Around 50 of them had barricaded themselves in their rooms, after having heard the order on Radio Stanleyville at 6:30 to kill all foreigners, but most obediently moved into the street, as they were heading for the airfield. After a short march, when the Simba rebels got word that the airport of Stanleyville was now under Belgian control, the hostages were ordered to sit down in the street.

After a few minutes, when heavy firing was heard nearby, some of the Simbas opened fire on the seated Belgians and Americans. The Paracommandos intervened and stabilized the situation by killing and/or driving away the Simbas. Of the 250 hostages gathered by the rebels, 18 were dead, and 40 were heavily wounded.

Paul Carlson, an American medical missionary, was among those killed during the raid. Around 1,600 foreign nationals and 150 Congolese civilians were evacuated. In addition to the direct victims during the raid, several others were killed as a reaction to the arrival of the Belgian troops. Among these victims were many missionaries, such as the Dox brothers. By mid-December, about one month after Operation Dragon Rouge, a total of 185 foreign hostages left behind in various Simba controlled areas of the Congo, along with a few thousand Congolese civilians, had been executed by the Simba rebels.

Aftermath 
The operation coincided with the arrival of Armée nationale congolaise (ANC) and other foreign mercenary units—which likely included the hastily-formed 5th Mechanised Brigade and Mike Hoare's 5 Commando—at Stanleyville, which was quickly captured. Because of growing international pressure, Belgium and the U.S. decided to abandon plans for follow-on operations in Bunia and Watsa. A second rescue operation, Operation Dragon Noir, was carried out in Paulis on 26 November. It took the central government until the end of the year to completely put down the remaining areas of the Simba rebellion.

Despite the success of the raid, Moise Tshombe's prestige was damaged by the joint Belgian–U.S. operation which saw white mercenaries and Western forces intervene once again in the Congo. In particular, Tshombe lost the support of President Joseph Kasa-Vubu and Chief of the Army Joseph-Desiré Mobutu. Tshombe was dismissed from his post as prime minister in October 1965. In Burundi, protests occurred outside the Belgian and United States embassies.

References

Bibliography

External links 
 
 Il y a 50 ans, à Stanleyville – La Libre Belgique, 3 August 2014 

1964 in the Democratic Republic of the Congo
Belgium–Democratic Republic of the Congo relations
Congo Crisis
Conflicts in 1964
Democratic Republic of the Congo–United States relations
Military operations involving Belgium
Military operations involving the United States
November 1964 events in Africa
Hostage rescue operations